Mahmut Sönmez (born January 25, 1990) is a Turkish-Dutch footballer who plays as a winger. Sönmez began his professional career with Preußen Münster, whom he joined in July 2012, having previously played amateur football in his hometown of Rotterdam. He made his 3. Liga debut a month later, as a substitute for Rico Schmider in a 2–1 defeat to SV Darmstadt 98. He left Münster after one season and three appearances.

References

External links
 Mahmut Sönmez Interview

1990 births
Living people
Dutch people of Turkish descent
Dutch footballers
SC Preußen Münster players
3. Liga players
Footballers from Rotterdam
RKSV Leonidas players
Association football wingers
Ido's Football Club players
RVVH players
Tweede Divisie players
Derde Divisie players
TFF Third League players
Feyenoord players